Shanghai Wanfeng Coach Manufacturing Co., Ltd. was a manufacturer of automobiles from the People's Republic of China.

Company history 
The company was founded in 1995. The headquarter was located in Pudong district of the city Shanghai. The preparation for the production of automobiles began in 2000 under the brand name, Wanfeng.In 2001 they started to make cars in a factory in Zhejiang Province. However, in 2008s, the company became defunct.

The year 2004 sales was the best for the company with 10,000 cars sold. After that sales declined fast and by 2005, only 4,000 cars were sold. By 2008 the company sold only 824 cars in the first five months and decided to cease the car making operation.

Vehicles  
Available vehicle products during the period were all-terrain vehicles and pick-ups with the model names as follows:
Wanfeng Taiwei 
Wanfeng Suwei
Wanfeng Suda
Wanfeng Caiyou
Wanfeng Fuyida

Production 

Note: The production number of 2003 refers only to SUVs. Additionally, 2445 pick-ups were created.

External links 
  (English, accessed on 6 February 2016)
 Internetseite der Wanfeng Auto Holding Group (English, accessed on February 6, 2016)
  d’Auto (Dutch, accessed on February 6, 2016)

References 

Car manufacturers of China
Vehicle manufacturing companies established in 1994
Chinese companies established in 1994
Chinese brands
Car brands